Old Tongues or  Oude Tongen  is a 1994 Dutch film directed by Gerardjan Rijnders.

Cast
Jasper Kraaij, as "Bartje Mossel"
Fred Goessens, as "Ab Mossel"
Lieneke le Roux, as "Ria Mossel"
Hannah Risselada, as "Babs"
Rosa Risselada, as "Nicole"
Mark Rietman, as "Dokter Peter Ligt"
Catherine ten Bruggencate, as "Dokter Jannie Ligt"
Nora Kretz, as "Oma Ligt"
Celia Nufaar, as "Heike in't Veld"
Damien Hope, as "Florisje Delevita"
Pierre Bokma, as "Richard Delevita"
Lineke Rijxman, as "Mary Delevita"
Hayo Bruins, as "Hans Godhelp"
Marjon Brandsma, as "Truus Godhelp"
Hein van der Heijden, as "Theo Klein"

External links 
 

Dutch drama films
1994 films
1990s Dutch-language films
1994 drama films